Rock'n'Roll Baby is the fifth studio release by Australian hard rock band, Wolfmother.

History 
The album was self-released and distributed by DistroKid on 29 December 2019. Two singles were released with the album, "Freedom Is Mine" and "Higher". The album was released with no advance notice and was recorded at a studio owned by Dave Grohl, with primitive production.

Track listing

References 

2019 albums
Self-released albums
Wolfmother albums